Lloyd Floyd (also known as The Man of 1,036 Voices) is an American voice actor who has been a Screen Actors Guild member since 1982.

Early life

As a child, he booked his first audition for Stephen DeAngelis of Grey Advertising for a Ground Round commercial. Years later he would go on to perform his first paid stand-up comedy gig at the local Ground Round on Route 9 W. He went on to advertise for several other products, including Curad Bandaids, North Eastern Electric at Howard Schwartz Recording, Intellivision with George Plimpton, Hi-C with Brian Bloom, a McGruff the Crime Dog PSA, also with Brian Bloom who he appeared with in an episode of "As The World Turns," and an on-camera commercial for the "Return of The Jedi" board game.

He also auditioned for and made it to the third round of callbacks for The Goonies, The Toy, and The NeverEnding Story. In freshman year of high school, Lloyd quit acting to pursue a career in rock 'n' roll. He fronted a number of bands between the years 1987 and 1997, most notably among them Shadow Harvest, The Tao, and Juan Von Michaelangelo. At 30 years old, he gave up on rock 'n' roll and entered the world of stand-up comedy and the Lower East Side's Art Stars scene in New York City.

Career

As a voice actor, Lloyd Floyd works primarily in video games. 
His gaming credits include multiple characters in the Grand Theft Auto series. As of 2016, he has appeared in more Grand Theft Auto games and Rockstar games than any other actor.  He was the voice of DJ Hans Oberlander in Grand Theft Auto: San Andreas and Larry Joe, the main host of the show Bait and Switch on VCPR in Grand Theft Auto: Vice City Stories. He also voices the recurring characters Gordon Moorehead and Pablo in Gordon Moorehead Rides Again, Dick in Republican Space Rangers, and characters in Princess Robot Bubblegum. Other Rockstar Games credits include Max Payne 3, Red Dead Revolver, Manhunt, Bully as the Russian jock Juri, and the Lieutenant of the Rogues in The Warriors video game. He is the voice of Luke Skywalker for LucasArts video games and starred as Luke Skywalker in the movie Lego Star Wars: The Empire Strikes Out, along with appearing in Disney Infinity 3.0.

Lloyd Floyd's film credits include Chicago 10 and The Great Easter Egg Escapade. He looped lines for Ewan McGregor in the film Robots. He plays 15 characters in the 2002 cult classic Don't Ask Don't Tell. His television credits include a two-year stint as a spokesman for Nikon cameras as well a numerous commercials. He is currently the voice of Checkers and Rally's restaurants, and he voices Gary Guitar, Fungus and Diego in Random! Cartoons. He was a recurring actor in the television series The Adventures of Electra Elf, produced and directed by Nick Zedd, in which he has played such characters as Super Ulcer, Tom Carvel and the voice of Neuter, a talking dog. He is also the voice of The Joker in DC Super Friends online. His podcast, The Lloyd Floyd Show, is currently on SoundCloud.

Lloyd Floyd has lent his voice to several Fisher-Price toys, including Rico of Penguins of Madagascar. His one-man show ran in 2009 and 2010 at the Bowery Poetry Club in New York City.

Personal life

His wedding to Rachel Cleary was featured on the TLC show Four Weddings.

Filmography

Films
 Davey & Goliath's Snowboard Christmas - Additional Voices
 Don't Ask Don't Tell - Chief Mussolino, Ziggy Freud, Nurse Bendover, Tom & Tim Truelock, Lucy The Librarian
 Electra Elf: The Beginning Parts One & Two - Goth Flunky #1
 Kung Fu Magoo - Tan Gu
 Lego Star Wars: The Empire Strikes Out - Luke Skywalker
 Phantom Boy - Additional Voices
 Tower of Silence - The Fallen

TV series
 DC Super Friends - Joker
 Go, Diego! Go! - Buffalo, Lions
 in-nyc - host, Himself
 Random! Cartoons - Gary Guitar, Fungus
 The Wrong Coast - Various Celebrity Voices

Video games
 1979 Revolution: Black Friday - Additional Voices
 Alan Wake - The Hitchhiker, Tor Anderson, Walter Snyder, Night Springs Narrator
 Alan Wake's American Nightmare - Tor, Narrator
 Bully - Juri Karamazov
 Conflict: Vietnam - Lieutenant
 CT Special Forces: Fire for Effect - Additional Voices
 Disney Infinity 3.0 - Luke Skywalker
 Goosebumps Horrorland - Additional Voices
 Grand Theft Auto IV - The Crowd of Liberty City, Dick
 Grand Theft Auto IV: The Ballad of Gay Tony - Master Hentai, Sword Boy, Talking Plant, Dick, Robot, Intellectual Alien
 Grand Theft Auto IV: The Lost and Damned - Dick, Robot, Intellectual Alien, Master Hentai, Sword Boy, Talking Plant
 Grand Theft Auto V - The Local Population, Gordon Moorehead, Russian, Pablo, Dirk, Canadian, Uberman, Master, Sword Boy, Dick, Sir Everly Malcontent, Various Brits, The Lab Imaging
 Grand Theft Auto: San Andreas - DJ Hans Oberlander, Pedestrian
 Grand Theft Auto: Vice City Stories - Larry Joe, Gordon Moorehead, Pablo
 Manhunt - Skinz
 Max Payne 3 - The Local Population
 Neverwinter Nights 2 - Wolf Thug, Shadow Priest, Bug Bear
 Order Up! - Mako Sho, Sweet Tooth, Russell Sprouts, Generic Patron
 Red Dead Revolver - Curly Shaw, Sandy Dodge, Bandits #1
 Saints Row: The Third - Radio Voices
 Star Wars: Empire at War - Luke Skywalker
 Star Wars: Empire at War: Forces of Corruption - Luke Skywalker
 Star Wars: The Force Unleashed - Ultimate Sith Edition - Luke Skywalker
 Star Wars: The Old Republic - Additional Voices
 The Warriors - Diego, Additional Soldier

Shorts
 Cesar Salad - Pepe And Radio Host
 Hipster Vice - Ice-T

Documentaries
 Chicago 10 - Robert Pierson, Arthur Aznavoorian, Police Officer
 Independent Lens - Arthur Aznavoorian, Police Officer

References

External links

Year of birth missing (living people)
Place of birth missing (living people)
Living people
American male video game actors
American male voice actors